The Fengtan Dam is an arch-gravity dam on the You River, located  southeast of Zhangjiajie in Hunan Province, China. The purpose of the multi-purpose dam is flood control, irrigation, power generation and navigation. Construction on the dam began in 1970 and the first generator was operational in 1978. All four of the original generators were operational by 1979. A power plant expansion project began in 2001 and in 2004 two additional 200 MW generators were commissioned.

Design
The dam's spillway is located on its downstream face and consists of 13 chutes controlled by radial gates. Six of the chutes have their flip buckets mid-way on the face of the dam while the seven others are on the lower portion. The original power house is located within the left side of the dam near the abutment and contains four 100 MW Francis turbine-generators. On the dam's right bank, there is a 50-ton boat lift which is also used to move lumber as well.

See also

List of dams and reservoirs in China
List of major power stations in Hunan

References

Dams in China
Hydroelectric power stations in Hunan
Arch-gravity dams
Dams completed in 1978